Ernesto de la Peña (21 November 1927 – 10 September 2012) was a Mexican writer, translator and cultural advocate. Peña was also a linguist and polyglot who studied thirty-three languages, as varied as Latin, Greek, Hebrew and Sanskrit. He joined the Mexican Academy of the Language in 1993 and was a member of the Royal Spanish Language Academy.

He studied classical literature at National Autonomous University of Mexico. His most famous books included The Stratagems of God, published in 1988; The Indelible Borrelli Case in 1992; Mineralogy For Intruders in 1999; and The Transfigured Rose, also released in 1999.

De la Peña was the recipient of the National Jose Pages Llergo Prize for Cultural Journalism, the National Prize for Arts and Sciences for linguistics in 2003, and the Fine Arts Gold Medal in 2007. In August 2012, Mexican Ambassador to Spain Francisco Javier Ramírez Acuña accepted the Menéndez Pelayo International Prize on Ernesto de la Peña's behalf, as the writer was too ill to travel to Menéndez Pelayo International University in Santander, Spain, to accept it in person. He received the Belisario Domínguez Medal of Honor, Mexico's highest honor, in a post mortem ceremony in 2012.

Ernesto de la Peña died of an illness on 10 September 2012, at the age of 84.

References

1927 births
2012 deaths
Writers from Mexico City
Linguists from Mexico